Thrikkakara is a region in the city of Kochi, as well as a municipality in Ernakulam District in the Indian state of Kerala, India. The municipality comprises 43 wards, including Marottichuvadu. It is especially notable for its significance in the festival of Onam, and in the tale associated with it linked to the famous Thrikkakara temple. Thrikkakara is home to the Cochin University of Science and Technology. The state owned Model Engineering College is also situated here. It is also home to many well known schools like Bhavans Varuna Vidyalaya, Cardinal Higher Secondary School, Cochin Public School and colleges like Bharat Mata College. The Infopark, Kochi and SmartCity Kochi are also situated in Thrikkakara municipal premises.

Etymology and Onam festival
The name Thrikkakkara is an evolved pronunciation of the word Thiru Kaal Kara, meaning the place of the holy foot. This connects to the tale behind the festival of Onam, by which, this is the place on which Lord Vamana set his foot to push down Mahabali to the 'lower world' Pathalam (also referred to as Suthalam). There is a place named Pathalam about 7 km from this place in the same district.

Following from the legend of Onam, Thrikkakkara is home for the associated shrine, the Thrikkakara Temple, where the deity enshrined is Vamana. It is one of the very few Vamana temples in India. Thrikkakara temple is considered to be the centre of Onam celebrations worldwide. The festival is largely attended by thousands of people from all religions. The Onam festival is celebrated here in a colourful manner as a festival spanning over ten days. Devotees contribute money for public feasts. A large number of mobile shops make it a trade fair. A notable fireworks show is held towards the end of the celebration.
Thrukkakkara was in Travancore state, 61 naduvazhis jointly organise the Onam festival under the leadership of the Maharaja of Travancore. Ananthapadmanabhan, the title holder is Chempil Arayan Ananthapadmanabhan Valiya Arayan, participated the festival with the Maharaja of Travancore.

See also 
Thrikkakara temple
Model Engineering College
Bharata Mata College

References

External links

  Thrikkakara Kakkanadu web site

Villages in Ernakulam district
Suburbs of Kochi